Menergy is the second album by The White Octave. It was released in 2001 by Initial Records.

Critical reception
Indy Week wrote that the album "aches with intelligently structured, sincerely emotive indie-rock a la D.C. post-punk, soaring and cresting across a variety of rhythms and combinations of bass/two-guitars/drums."  AllMusic called it "quirky, jangled nerdy rock with catchy riffs and a passionate demeanor."

Track listing

References

2001 albums
The White Octave albums
Initial Records albums